Arnaldur Indriðason  (pronounced ; born 28 January 1961) is an Icelandic writer of crime fiction; his most popular series features the protagonist Detective Erlendur.

Biography
Arnaldur was born in Reykjavík on 28 January 1961, the son of writer Indriði G. Þorsteinsson. He graduated with a degree in history from the University of Iceland (Háskóli Íslands) in 1996. He worked as a journalist for the newspaper Morgunblaðið from 1981 to 1982, and later as a freelance writer. From 1986 to 2001, he was a film critic for Morgunblaðið.

His first book, Sons of Earth (Synir duftsins) came out in 1997, the first in the series with Detective Erlendur. The first two novels in the series have not yet been translated into English. , the series included 14 novels. Arnaldur is considered one of the most popular writers in Iceland in recent years — topping bestseller lists time and again. In 2004, his books were 7 of the 10 most popular titles borrowed in Reykjavík City Library. In 2006, his Erlendur novel Mýrin was made into a film, known internationally as Jar City, by Icelandic director Baltasar Kormákur.

Arnaldur's novels have sold over 14 million copies worldwide, in 40 languages, including Arabic, Russian, Polish, German, Greek, Danish, Catalan, English, Portuguese, Italian, Czech, Swedish, Norwegian, Dutch, Finnish, Spanish, Hungarian, Chinese, Croatian, Romanian, Bulgarian, French, Serbian, Slovenian and Turkish .

Awards
Arnaldur received the Glass Key award, a literature prize for the best Nordic crime novel, in 2002 and 2003. He won the Crime Writers' Association Gold Dagger Award in 2005 for his novel Silence of the Grave. He won the world's most lucrative crime fiction award, the RBA Prize for Crime Writing worth €125,000, in 2013 for Shadow Alley (Skuggasund).

Bibliography

Detective Erlendur series
Synir duftsins (Sons of The Dust), 1997
Dauðarósir (Silent Kill), 1998
[[Jar City|Mýrin (Jar City)]], 2000. Trans. 2004
Grafarþögn (Silence of the Grave), 2001. Trans. 2006
Röddin (Voices), 2003. Trans. 2007
Kleifarvatn (The Draining Lake), 2004. Trans. 2008
Vetrarborgin (Arctic Chill), 2005. Trans. 2009Harðskafi (Hypothermia), 2007. Trans. 2010Myrká (Outrage), 2008. Trans. 2012Svörtuloft (Black Skies), 2009. Trans. 2013Furðustrandir (Strange Shores), 2010. Trans. 2014

 Young Erlendur Einvígið (The Duel), 2011Reykjavíkurnætur (Reykjavik Nights), 2012. Trans. 2015
 Kamp Knox (Oblivion), 2014. Published in the U.S. as Into Oblivion, 2016

 Reykjavik Wartime Mystery series (Flovent and Thorson) Skuggasund (The Shadow District), 2013. Trans. 2017Þýska húsið (The Shadow Killer), 2015. Trans. 2018Petsamo, 2016.

 Konráð series Myrkrið veit (The Darkness Knows), 2017. Trans. 2021Stúlkan hjá brúnni (The Girl by the Bridge), 2018Tregasteinn (The Quiet Mother), 2019Þagnarmúr (Wall of Silence), 2020Kyrrþey, 2022

Other novelsNapóleonsskjölin (Operation Napoleon), 1999. Trans. 2011Bettý, 2003Konungsbók, 2006

Other writings
 Leyndardómar Reykjavíkur 2000 (one chapter; 2000)
 Reykjavík-Rotterdam'' (screenplay co-writer, 2008)

See also 

 List of Icelandic writers
 Icelandic literature

References

Notes

1961 births
Living people
Arnaldur Indridason
Arnaldur Indridason
Arnaldur Indridason
Barry Award winners
Mystery writers
Arnaldur Indridason
Arnaldur Indridason